Etienne Tynevez (born 13 February 1999) is a French field hockey player.

Career

Club level
In club competition, Tynevez plays for Gantoise in the Belgian Hockey League.

Les Bleus
Etienne Tynevez made his debut for Les Bleus in 2017 during a Tri–Nations Tournament in Spain.

Since his debut, Tynevez became a regular inclusion in the national squad. He has appeared in a number of test–series' and competitions, including an appearance at the 2018 FIH World Cup in Bhubaneswar, where the team finished eighth.

He has since gone on to win a gold medal in the 2018–19 FIH Hockey Series in Le Touquet. He was most recently names in the national squad for season three of the FIH Pro League.

References

External links
 
 

1999 births
Living people
French male field hockey players
Male field hockey forwards
Men's Belgian Hockey League players
Place of birth missing (living people)
French expatriate sportspeople in Belgium
Expatriate field hockey players
2018 Men's Hockey World Cup players
2023 Men's FIH Hockey World Cup players